District Judge may refer to: 

 A United States federal judge, appointed by the President and confirmed by the Senate
 A judge in a State court (United States), where the state is divided into judicial districts
 Judiciary of England and Wales#District judges
 A judge in the District courts of India
 The short name for a Judge of the District Court (Ireland) in the Republic of Ireland
 The short name for a Judge of the District Courts of Sri Lanka in Sri Lanka
 In the judiciary of Northern Ireland:
 District Judge, judge that sits to hear pre-trial applications and small claims cases in the County court, previously known as a Circuit Registrar
 District Judge, judge that presides over the Magistrates' Courts, formerly known as a resident magistrate